Little Strickland is a civil parish in the Eden District, Cumbria, England.  It contains eleven listed buildings that are recorded in the National Heritage List for England.  Of these, one is listed at Grade II*, the middle of the three grades, and the others are at Grade II, the lowest grade.  The parish contains the village of Little Strickland and the surrounding countryside.  The listed buildings comprise houses, farmhouses, farm buildings, and a church and associated structures. In April 2019 Thrimby parish was merged with Little Strickland, for its buildings, see Listed buildings in Thrimby.


Key

Buildings

References

Citations

Sources

Lists of listed buildings in Cumbria